The ASEAN–Australia Development Cooperation Program (AADCP or AADCP II) is a seven-year program which jointly managed by ASEAN Secretariat and the Australian Agency for International Development (AusAID – aimed to helping ASEAN establish a regional Economic Community by 2015.

Background

History 

AADCP is a program initiated jointly by two organisations, the Australian government and the Association of Southeast Asian Nations (ASEAN). ASEAN, a key association to connect Southeast Asian nations, was founded by Indonesia, Malaysia, Philippines, Singapore and Thailand in 1967, and later Vietnam, Lao, Myanmar, and Cambodia joined. Australia was among the first partners of ASEAN to establish economic collaboration with southeast Asian countries giving priority to regional development.

Australia has a strong interest in regional development in South-East Asia regions due to geographic proximity and socio-economic interactions. Over 15 per cent of Australia's total trade involves countries within ASEAN, totalling over $100 billion value in 2014. This number reached $224 billion in 2016 between 10 member nations of ASEAN and Australia. However, unequal development in South-East Asia remains a problem that requires collaborative effort. New entry members of ASEAN, Cambodia, Lao, Myanmar, and Vietnam, referred to as CLMV countries, lose custom revenue from ASEAN imports in the short-term, but long-term economic benefits overweigh the short-term losses. Assistants are needed to help CLMV countries better integrate into ASEAN. AADCP Phase I was signed in August 2020 with a $45 billion deal, while the initial planning started in January 1999. AADCP Phase II started after a one-year transition period after Phase I completed in 2008.

Processor program, AAECP (1974–2004) 
The predecessor of AADCP, a program called ASEAN Australia Economic Cooperation Program (AAECP), was initiated in 1974. AAECP has three stages, lasting for 30 years, from 1974 to 2004. At the end of AAECP Phase III, the new program AADCP was formed to continue to provide support to regional economic development by strengthening collaboration between ASEAN and Australia. AAECP received recognition from both Australia and ASEAN, "The strength of the partnership between Australia and ASEAN, aside from the advantages presented by their geographic proximity, is in part due to the increasing complementarities of the relationship and the dynamism of the economies in the region. It is also due to both partners’ determination to continually assess the relationship and implement changes to suit the needs of the two sides." In the last phase of AAECP, Australia strengthened the scope of technical assistant on energy policy and research analysis. AAECP provided valuable lessons for future program development.

Function 
Southeast Asian nations underwent dramatic transformations during 1974 and 2004, when some nations gained significant economic growth under globalisation. However, uneven development in terms of economic growth, equity and exchange still remained a major concern. The main objective of AADCP is to assist ASEAN achieve regional development goals through cooperation between Australia and ASEAN nations. The overall goal of AADCP aligns with Vision 2020, the Hanoi Plan of Actions and the Vientiane Action Programme, prioritising economic and social cooperation. Other objectives include enhancing institutional capacities, facilitating cooperation in the field of science and technology, as well as helping new members of ASEAN smoothly integrate into ASEAN through cooperation programs.  Later entry members may experience particularly difficulty in uneven developments because some of the founding ASEAN nations underwent drastic transformation in the 1980s and achieved a high rate of urbanisation. There was the need to launch the second phase of AADCP to better adapt to changes in ASEAN members to achieve the overall objective. 

The purpose of AACDP is to promote co-operation between Australia and ASEAN in areas of agreed regional development priorities. It is funded by Australia's overseas aid agency, AusAID, a principal foreign aid management agency of the Australian government, supervised by the Department of Foreign Affairs and Trade. It was continued to keep pace with economic progress in Southeast Asia and to promote the strong relations between ASEAN and Australia. Offices of AADCP are located in Jakarta.

Program structure

Phase I

Program Stream (PS) 
Launched in 1999, PS consisted of 12 main projects to help ASEAN integrate into one market by focusing on the quality and safety of agriculture and food products. These projects are pre-selected, medium-term economic integration projects. The first four initial PS projects cover areas including e-commerce, skill-recognition systems, fruit and vegetable quality control, and fishery products. Australia Implementing Partners (AIPs) were appointed for each program stream to carry out the program. While all the projects were pre-selected, the funding allocation among all members of the ASEAN was ambiguous, and the challenge is to meet the diverse interests of all regions in the project selection and design phase.

Regional Partnership Scheme (RPS) 
RPS facilitated 29 small-scale projects by establishing collaboration between the Australian government and ASEAN partners. All projects are jointly prepared and operated by AADCP’s Program Planning and Monitoring Support Unit (PPMSU) and ASEAN. ANSEA’s AEC Blueprint provides guidelines for program design and implementation.

Regional Economic Policy Support Facility (REPSF) 
REPSF was the first stream initiated in 2002, focusing on small to medium-scale economic policy research projects. Policy research was designed to help ASEC improve economic integration among all ASEAN members. REPSF has a few guidelines including modalities, team selection, and research management to ensure research gives priority to the corresponding stakeholders of AADCP while maintaining a certain degree of research autonomy. Due to the targeted agency and focused research theme, REPSF provided funding for a unique collection of first-hand data such as "A Background Paper for the Strategic Plan of Action on ASEAN Cooperation in Food and Agriculture (2005–2010)", and 03/006(e) "The Pattern of Intra ASEAN Trade in the Priority Goods Sectors". Upon completion, research reports were presented to corresponding ASEAN collaborators, providing useful insights for policy making.

Phase II 
Phase II expanded the scope of work streams to the following 11 streams: Corporate development, Monitoring and evaluation, Services, Investment, Consumer protection, Agriculture, Connectivity, Financial integration, Cross Cutting issues, IAI/NDG. These work streams were developed to improve ASEC’s capacity to achieve its post-2015 agenda. Considering ASEC’s post-2015 agenda and AADCP’s resources, AADCP’s post-2015 vision emphases on political and security cooperation, economic cooperation, and socio-cultural cooperation. Major delays occurred at the start of AADCP II due to difficulties in funding management and program development. Statistics showed poor management capability, including inexperienced staff and uncompetitive salaries, at the initial stage. The 2012 assessment result suggested that there was a need to improve management systems within ASEAN and to build personal relationships to facilitate the program implementation and economic integration.

AADCP II has four major components:

 strengthen institutional capacity: $8 million
 economic research: $10 million
 economic community implementation: $22 million
 technical specialist and management support: $17 million.

The 2019 annual report highlights achievements of AADCP in providing support to agriculture and food, research on understanding foreign direct investment in ASEAN, and strengthening consumer production. Additionally, based on previous feedback, the project management system was strengthened by increasing the capacity of ASEAN Secretaries, which can help facilitate future programs more efficiently.

Approaches

Partnership 
ASEAN member countries, ASEAN Secretariat, and the Australian government work in collaboration to identity program priorities and objectives. Similar to the EU, and the USA, Australia’s collaboration with ASEAN is guided by ASEAN’s vision for Economic Community (AEC) projects, ensuring ASEAN’s liberal turn. AADCP’s partnership approach ensures that ASEAN has local ownership for implementing regional-specific goals without policy interference. This partnership also brings challenges and constraints at the cost of effectiveness and efficiency. Because programs and decisions can only move forward when all involved partners agree upon certain decisions, which increase the requirement for regular meetings and transparency. The potential of a partnership approach has not been fully utilised through sufficient support on providing expertised experiences. This remains one of the key objectives for improvements.

Project development and approval 
AADCP projects are incredibly diverse because addressing the problem of uneven development can range from a wide range of fields, and different partner countries have unique needs. Due to the diversity of the type of projects, project development becomes challenged on top of a partnership focused approach. "Project-based approach" provides more flexibility in allocating cooperation program funding to relevant projects under the general umbrella term as long as the programs align with the general goals of ASEAN’s regional developments. This allows a wide range of projects at different stages to be proposed and managed at the same time.

monitoring and evaluation 
The general management and evaluation framework involves daily management activities to ensure the smooth and efficient operation of AADCP. M&E activities include annual assessment, case studies, and frequent meetings and reports. A number of independent and official reports have been published to provide a transparent assessment on the progress of the programs.  These reports, both available for Phase I and Phase II, provide comprehensive assessment of the outcomes of the programs. The subsequent programs are designed based on lessons learned from previous stages.

Funding 
AADCP is fully funded by the Australia government. The initial funding for AADCP Phase I (2002-08) is A$45 million. AADCP II committed A$57 million for 2008-2019. Funding is delivered directly to ASEAN Secretariat, but management is done by the ASEAN Secretariat and the Australian Government through outside contractors.

Projects

Aquafeeds in Asia 
In 1992, 84% of total global aquaculture production was in Asian countries. This research study was published by Farm-made Aquafeeds Organisation (FAO) and AADCP to help improve economical feeding and production strategies. This project also includes national reports of regional ingredient, manufacturing, and feeding strategies.

The assessment study of the Ha Noi Plan of Action (HPA) 
This REPSF research project provides a comprehensive assessment of the progress and achievements of the Ha Noi Plan of Action (HPA), which is considered the first program contributing to ASEAN’s Vision 2020. HPA was designed to provide management, marketing, and public relation tools to guide ASEAN’s work. Because there was no defined achievement indicator, assessments were largely qualitative. The overall conclusion was that countries largely benefited from the Ha Noi Plan of Action (HPA).

ASEAN-Australia-New Zealand Free Trade Agreement (AANZFTA) 
AANZFTA helps develop ASEAN’s capacity to involve in trading negotiations and maximise the benefits of trading programs. This aligns with Australia’s Aid Investment Plan strategies. Part of AADCI post-2015 agenda is to ensure effective implementation of AANZFTA and raising trading opportunities. By maximising real commercial benefits and increasing ASEAN’s capacity, AADCI supports AANZFTA, aligning with the major workstreams of AADCI Stage II.

Animal health and biosecurity 
Animal and plant health management is a traditional collaboration area between ASEAN and Australia. AADCP continues this tradition of collaboration as a leading role to provide regional areas a more advanced management system in regulation risks associated with product export, diseases. International regulations often require exporting countries to provide information on a list of pets, and such obligation suggests a requirement to comply with standards rather than voluntary effort. The challenges with the related programs are that not all ASEAN countries have surplus products for exporting, thus decreasing the need to achieve internationally recognized standards.

Result and impact 
All three streams of AADCP Phase I achieved successes in achieving the overall aims. AADCP provided high-quality research relevant to the topic of regional economic development in the South-East Asia region. These research provide valuable data and analysis in areas such as intra ASEAN trade and integration, financial services, communication regulations, labour migration, etc. PS organised activities to assist policy development, enhance institutional capacity, and improve information sharing through skill training and guidelines. AADCP Phase I had limited success in collaboration in science and environment. In addition, further effort is required to ensure new ASEAN entry members become integrated into the program. AADCP remains the key program for regional development of ASEAN countries and a link between Australia and Southeast Asian countries. Based on over 40-year experiences of the partnership scheme, learning opportunities facilitated improvements on project management and implementation efficiency.

Besides the successes, criticism also challenges the collaboration between ASEAN and Australia that "there are no unique bonds between ASEAN and Australia", and Australia is rather an "awkward" partner. Australia’s interest in Asia does not necessarily reflect a special interest in the Southeast Asia regions. This conclusion is based on assessing loyalty of partners, which reflects the effectiveness of programs such as AAECP and AADCP. For instance, during the dispute between Australia and East Timor regarding a permanent maritime border in the Timor Sea, ASEAN failed to show support to the Australian government. The lack of unique, personal relations between ASEAN and Australia results in significant challenges. Another major criticism is the under-representation of programs related to promoting gender equality, which is listed as one of the major objectives of AADCP. However, there is a significant mismatch between the objective of promoting equity and the number of projects related to such objectives. The recommendations are to either attribute gender equality related objectives as less prioritised at the current stage, or to advocate for more programs in the area.

References

External links
 AusAID, East Asia, Program overview

International development multilaterals
Australia–Asia relations
Organizations associated with ASEAN
Organizations established in 1999
1999 establishments in Australia